In differential geometry, a field of mathematics, a normal bundle is a particular kind of vector bundle, complementary to the tangent bundle, and coming from an embedding (or immersion).

Definition

Riemannian manifold
Let  be a Riemannian manifold, and  a Riemannian submanifold. Define, for a given , a vector  to be normal to  whenever  for all  (so that  is orthogonal to ).

.

The conormal bundle is defined as the dual bundle to the normal bundle. It can be realised naturally as a sub-bundle of the cotangent bundle.

General definition
More abstractly, given an immersion  (for instance an embedding), one can define a normal bundle of N in M, by at each point of N, taking the quotient space of the tangent space on M by the tangent space on N. For a Riemannian manifold one can identify this quotient with the orthogonal complement, but in general one cannot (such a choice is equivalent to a section of the projection ).

Thus the normal bundle is in general a quotient of the tangent bundle of the ambient space restricted to the subspace.

Formally, the normal bundle to N in M is a quotient bundle of the tangent bundle on M: one has the short exact sequence of vector bundles on N:

where  is the restriction of the tangent bundle on  M to N (properly, the pullback  of the tangent bundle on M to a vector bundle on N via the map ).

Conormal bundle

Therefore we can define a non-degenerate pairing

that induces an isomorphism of sheaves . We can rephrase this fact by introducing the conormal bundle  defined via the conormal exact sequence

,

.

Stable normal bundle
Abstract manifolds have a canonical tangent bundle, but do not have a normal bundle: only an embedding (or immersion) of a manifold in another yields a normal bundle.

The resulting class of normal bundles (it is a class of bundles and not a specific bundle because N could vary) is called the stable normal bundle.

Dual to tangent bundle
The normal bundle is dual to the tangent bundle in the sense of K-theory: 
by the above short exact sequence,

in the Grothendieck group.

This is useful in the computation of characteristic classes, and allows one to prove lower bounds on immersibility and embeddability of manifolds in Euclidean space.

For symplectic manifolds
Then one can define the symplectic normal bundle to X as the vector bundle over X with fibres

where  denotes the embedding. Notice that the constant rank condition ensures that these normal spaces fit together to form a bundle. Furthermore, any fibre inherits the structure of a symplectic vector space.

The isomorphism

of symplectic vector bundles over  implies that the symplectic normal bundle already determines the constant rank embedding locally. This feature is similar to the Riemannian case.

References

Algebraic geometry
Differential geometry
Differential topology
Vector bundles